Ain Gordon is an American playwright, theatrical director and actor based in New York City.  His work frequently deals with the interstices of history, focusing on people and events which are often overlooked or marginalized in "official" histories.  His style combines elements of traditional playwrighting with aspects of performance art.

Life and career
Gordon was born in New York City, the son of British-American dancer Valda Setterfield and postmodern dancer-choreographer and theatrical director David Gordon.

Gordon, who attended New York City Public Schools and New York University, and worked as a stage electrician at Dance Theater Workshop (DTW), began writing and directing for the stage in 1985, emerging in the downtown dance/performance scene with four consecutive seasons at DTW plus performances at Movement Research, The Poetry Project, and Performance Space 122.  By 1990 Gordon was recognized in the inaugural round of the National Endowment for the Arts "New Forms" initiative – funding for artists whose work defied clear classification. He then began touring to venues including the Baltimore Museum of Art, and Dance Place in Washington, DC.

In 1991, Gordon entered a multi-project relationship with Soho Rep in New York City that encompassed five productions and workshops.  In 1992, he began a collaboration with his father, choreographer and director David Gordon, on The Family Business, which went on to be performed in New York at Lincoln Center's Serious Fun! Festival, Dance Theater Workshop, New York Theatre Workshop and the Mark Taper Forum in Los Angeles.  This production won him his first Obie Award, in 1994.

In 1992, Gordon became Co-Director of the Pick Up Performance Company, which had been founded by his father in 1971 and incorporated in 1978.  With the death of the elder Gordon in 2022, Ain Gordon became the Director of the company, with Alyce Dissette continuing in her role as Producing Director.

Gordon won his second Obie Award in 1996 for his play Wally's Ghost, which was presented at Soho Rep. In 1998, he was awarded a Guggenheim Fellowship in Playwriting.  It was here that he gained recognition for his abiding subject: marginalized and forgotten history, and the invisible players who inhabit that space, developing a blend of historical fact, imagined truth and complete fiction that continues to dominate his work.

Gordon's next few years were spent collaborating with David Gordon on two projects – Punch and Judy Get Divorced for American Music Theater Festival at the Plays and Players Theatre in Philadelphia and the American Repertory Theater at the C. Walsh Theatre of Suffolk University in Boston,<ref>"Punch and Judy Get Divorced" About the Artists"</ref> and The First Picture Show for the American Conservatory Theater in San Francisco and the Mark Taper Forum in L.A. In addition, Gordon received a commission from the Taper, and another from the Lincoln Center Institute, and had a new play workshopped at The Public Theater and Soho Rep. In 2001, Gordon returned to his roots in the Manhattan downtown scene with several productions at HERE Arts Center, DTW, and P.S. 122, including Art Life & Show-Biz, a "non-fiction play" based on the lives and careers of avant-garde actress Lola Pashalinski (Charles Ludlam's Ridiculous Theatrical Company), Broadway actress Helen Gallagher (No, No, Nanette), and Gordon's mother, the dancer Valda Setterfield (Merce Cunningham, David Gordon), in which the three subjects appeared as themselves.  The play was published in 2010 in the anthology Dramaturgy of the Real, where Robert Vorlicky referred to it as "an act of remembrance and memorialization, fashioned through memories ... a scrapbook filled with snapshots from the lives of three inspirational artists."

Gordon continues to write theater that straddles the traditions of playwrighting and performance art, blending fact and fiction.  Since 2005, his work has been awarded both the Multi-Arts Production Fund (MAP) Grant and the Arts Presenters Ensemble Theatre Collaborations Program grant funded by the Doris Duke Charitable Trust, with productions at the Krannert Center in Urbana, Illinois, the VSA North Fourth Arts Center in Albuquerque, New Mexico, 651 ARTS in Brooklyn, LexArts in Lexington, Kentucky, and DiverseWorks in Houston, Texas.

In 2007, Gordon won his third Obie Award for his performance as Spalding Grey in the Off-Broadway production of Spalding Gray: Stories Left To Tell, which also toured to venues including UCLA Live, the TBA Festival at the Portland Institute for Contemporary Art in Oregon, ICA Boston – where he was an Elliot Norton Award nominee – the Walker Art Center in Minneapolis, and Painted Bride Art Center in Philadelphia, among others.  In 2008-9 Gordon collaborated with choreographer Bebe Miller on Necessary Beauty, a multi-disciplinary evening-length work co-commissioned by the Wexner Center of Ohio State University, DTW, and the Myrna Loy Center/Helena Presents in Helena, Montana. He was commissioned by the VSA North Fourth Arts Center to write The History of Asking the Wrong Question, rooted in Native American history, and developed a new two-person play, and a one-woman play, as a Core Writer of the Playwrights' Center in Minneapolis."Ain Gordon: A Disaster Begins"  on the DiverseWorks website The one-woman play, A Disaster Begins, is based on the events of the devastating 1900 Galveston Hurricane.

The Painted Bride Art Center in Philadelphia commissioned Gordon to write If She Stood, about the women of the early abolitionist movement in that city, including Sarah Grimké and Sarah Mapps Douglass.  The play premiered on April 26, 2013.  Later in 2013, his new play, Not What Happened, about historical reenactment and its relation to actual events, was presented at a number of theatres, including the Flynn Center for the Performing Arts in Burlington, Vermont, the Krannert Center, and the Brooklyn Academy of Music.  It was directed by Ken Rus Schmoll.

In 2016, Gordon's play, 217 Boxes of Dr. Henry Anonymous, premiered at the Painted Bride Art Center.  The play explores the life of Dr. John E. Fryer, a gay psychiatrist who appeared in disguise at the 1972 annual convention of the American Psychiatric Association as part of a campaign to remove homosexuality from the APA's Diagnostic and Statistical Manual of Mental Disorders.  The play is the result of Gordon's research as an "embedded artist" in the Historical Society of Pennsylvania.Staff (April 25, 2016) "Ain Gordon World Premiere Set for Painted Bride Arts Center" Broadway World PhiladelphiaCrimmins, Peter (May 4, 2016) "Raising the curtain on life of Dr. Anonymous, Philly gay rights pioneer"  Newsworks  The play was remounted in May 2018 at the Baryshnikov Arts Center by the Equality Forum to coincide with the annual meeting of the APA, held that year in New York City, and again at Fryer's alma mater, Transylvania University, in Lexington, Kentucky in May 2019.

The Baryshnikov Arts Center in May 2017 premiered Gordon's piece Radicals in Miniature – made and performed in collaboration with Josh Quillen of So Percussion – which focused on people Gordon knew in his youth who are now dead. The New York Times said of it "The people Mr. Gordon portrays weren’t successful or all that skilled, but they were around while he was learning what an artist is and does, and how a gay man lives and dies. By telling their stories — in alliterative, associative prose that can sound a lot like poetry — Mr. Gordon is, of course, telling his own. This is autobiography disguised as séance, masquerading as eulogy, camouflaged as performance."  A year later, the piece was presented as part of the International Festival of Arts & Ideas in New Haven, Connecticut, and has since been performed in a number of other venues.

In May 2022, Gordon's play These Don't Easily Scatter was presented in Philadelphia at the William Way LGBT Community Center as past of Remembrance, an alternative memorial to the HIV/AIDS crisis of the 1970s in that city.Wild, Stephi (May 10, 2022) "World Theatre Premiere Of Ain Gordon's THESE DON'T EASILY SCATTER Comes to Philadelphia" Broadway World  The play subsequently had a showing at the Baryshnikov Arts Center in New York City.

Aside from directing most of his own plays, Gordon has directed the work of So Percussion – including Where (we) Live (2013) and A Gun Show, which was performed at the Harvey Theater of the Brooklyn Academy of Music in late 2016 – as well as works by choreographer Emily Johnson.

WorksEnd Over End  (1986) – Dance Theatre WorkshopEpic Family Epic or The Hell Family Dinner(1988) – Dance Theater Workshop; 
(2003, revised) – Dance Theater Workshop
(2007, revised version) – Krannert Center (Urbana, Illinois), VSA North Fourth Arts Center (Albuquerque, New Mexico)The Family Business (with David Gordon; 1992–94) – Dance Theater Workshop, New York Theatre Workshop, Mark Taper Forum (Los Angeles)Wally's Ghost  (1996) – Soho RepPunch and Judy Get Divorced (with David Gordon, music by Edward Barnes; 1996) – American Music Theatre Festival (Plays and Players Theatre, Philadelphia), American Repertory Theatre (C. Walsh Theatre of Suffolk University)Birdseed Bundles 
(1997, workshop) – Soho Rep; 
(2000) – Dance Theatre WorkshopThe First Picture Show (with David Gordon, music by Jeanine Tesori; 1999) – Mark Taper Forum, American Conservatory Theater (San Francisco)93 Acres of Barley (2001) – Mark Taper Forum; (about the history of Culver City, California)Private Ghosts - Public Stories (2002) – Cornerstone Theater Company (Los Angeles), George Street Playhouse (New Brunswick, New Jersey)Art, Life & Show Biz  (2003-2004) – P.S. 122, Club FezIn This Place... (2008-2012) – LexArts (Lexington, Kentucky), 651 ARTS (Brooklyn), Kitchen Theatre Company (Ithaca, New York), Painted Bride Art Center (Philadelphia)Staff (May 23, 2008) "Flyover: Arts in the American Outback" Arts JournalZinman, Toby (March 9, 2012) "Review: In This Place..." The Philadelphia InquirerA Disaster Begins  (2009) – HERE Arts Center Mainstage (Manhattan), DiverseWorks Art Space (Houston, Texas);The History of Asking the Wrong Question (2012) – VSA North Fourth Arts CenterIf She Stood (2013) – Painted Bride Art CenterNot What Happened (2013) 
(workshop) – Vermont Performance Lab at Marlboro Town House (Marlboro, Vermont), MassMoCA, Baryshnikov Arts Center
(full production) – Flynn Center for the Performing Arts (Burlington, Vermont), Vermont Performance Lab at New England Youth Theater (Brattleboro, Vermont), Krannert Center, Brooklyn Academy of Music217 Boxes of Dr. Henry Anonymous(2016) – Painted Bride Art Center
(2018) – Baryshinikov Arts Center
(2019) – Transylvania University (Lexington, Kentucky); Freud Playhouse (UCLA)Radicals in Miniature(2015–17, workshop) – Baryshnikov Arts Center, Vermont Performance Lab at Marlboro College, Bruno Walter Auditorium of the New York Public Library for the Performing Arts
(2017–19, full production) – Baryshnikov Arts Center, Vermont Performance Lab at Next Stage (Putney, Vermont), International Festival of Arts & Ideas (Iseman Theater of Yale University), Williams College, Connecticut College, Fairfield University The Yard (Martha's Vineyard, Massachusetts).These Don't Easily Scatter'' (2022)
(workshop) – Boston University School of the Arts
(full production) – William Way LGBT Community Center (Philadelphia, Pennsylvania)
(showing) – Baryshnikov Arts Center

References

External links
 
 

Living people
American dramatists and playwrights
Obie Award recipients
Year of birth missing (living people)
Place of birth missing (living people)